The 1969–70 Pittsburgh Pipers season was the 2nd season of the team in Pittsburgh (third overall) in the American Basketball Association. The Pipers, having moved back to Pittsburgh after one season in Minnesota, faltered without Connie Hawkins (who had gone to the Phoenix Suns) alongside injuries and middling attendance. The Pipers lost the first 9 games of the 1970 calendar year, with their biggest win streak being 3 games (done twice). The team finished 8th in points per game (112.4 per game) and points allowed (117 per game). After the season, the team was bought by Haven Industries, Inc. - the owner of the "Jack Frost" brand of sugar products. Subsequently, they decided to rebrand the team as the Pittsburgh Condors for the 1970 season.

Roster 
 15 Larry Bergh - Power forward
 23 / 45 John Brisker - Small forward
 -- Steve Chubin - Shooting guard
 13 Warren Davis - Power forward
 12 Dennis Hamilton - Power forward
 12 Art Heyman - Forward / Guard
 13 Stew Johnson - Power forward
 14 Arvesta Kelly - Point guard
 35 Wilbur Kirkland - Forward
 24 Mike Lewis - Center
 -- Lonnie Lynn - Small forward
 -- Bill McGill - Center
 34 Maurice McHartley - Shooting guard
 22 Barry Orms - Point guard
 21 Craig Raymond - Center
 -- John Smith - Center
 11 Justus Thigpen - Shooting guard
 25 George Thompson - Shooting guard
 22 Steve Vacendak - Point guard
 10 Chico Vaughn - Shooting guard
 32 Trooper Washington - Power forward
 44 Charlie Williams - Shooting guard

Final standings

Eastern Division

Awards and honors
1970 ABA All-Star Game selections (game played on January 24, 1970)
 Charlie Williams

References

 Pipers on Basketball Reference

External links
 RememberTheABA.com 1969-70 regular season and playoff results
 Pipers page

Pittsburgh Condors seasons
Pittsburgh
Pittsburg
Pittsburg